George Appert (1850–1934) was a French painter.

Selected paintings

References

External links 

 George Appert at the "Invaluable" artists site
 George Appert at the "BlouinArtInfo" site

1850 births
1934 deaths
19th-century French painters
19th-century French male artists
French male painters
20th-century French painters
20th-century French male artists